Knoxville Area Transit (KAT) is the operator of public transportation in Knoxville, Tennessee. Twenty-five routes operate. Service on KAT routes operate weekdays and Saturdays with routes 11, 12, 20, 22, 23, 31, 33, 34 and 41 and 42 offering Sunday service. All routes, except for routes 13,16, 19, 44 and 90 start at the Knoxville Station in Downtown. The Knoxville Trolley is a free shuttle service which provides service to the university and the downtown area.

History
Public transportation in Knoxville dates back to 1876 when the first street cars of the Knoxville Street Railway Company were pulled by horses and mules along tracks on Gay Street. Since then, the transit system has undergone considerable changes, beginning in 1890 with the conversion from animal-drawn to electric-powered streetcars.  In 1910, the system serviced 11 million passengers each year on 42 miles of track, introducing buses to serve the streetcar system's feeder routes in 1929.  By the late 1940s, the system had mainly switched from electric streetcars to all buses, with electric streetcars making their last run in 1947.  Later, in 1958, a bus service to the University of Tennessee was added to the system.  The bus service continued to get upgrades, with air-conditioned GMC buses added to the Knoxville transit fleet in 1972.

In the 1980s and 1990s, the Knoxville transit system went through some internal changes, first moving into a new facility on Magnolia Avenue in 1989 and then changing its name from "K-Trans" to "Knoxville Area Transit (KAT)" in 1995. From the 90s onward, the KAT system continued to upgrade, with a focus on environmental responsibility, beginning its Clean Fuels Program with the introduction of propane-powered vehicles in 2003.  The next year, the KAT system was named North American Transit System of the Year by the American Public Transportation Association.  In 2010, the transit system again changed facilities, moving its center of operations to the John J. Duncan Jr. Knoxville Station.  In 2014, KAT introduced three hybrid vehicles into its regular fleet.

Beginning in March 2020, all fares are free and riders must wear masks upon boarding, in addition to rear door boarding. Fare collections resumed in February 2021; all busses will have driver shields to minimize interaction.

Routes

Regular Knoxville area routes

Lines with asterisks (*) denote lines that operate daily.

Gameday Shuttles
KAT offers special shuttles for football games, which operate solely on specific dates. All lines terminate at Neyland Stadium. These lines are assigned the special "51" designator.

Knoxville Trolley Lines

The LIFT

KAT offers Paratransit LIFT service for those persons who are unable to use regular fixed-route buses. The LIFT is by reservation only, and you must be certified by KAT to use the service.

Hours
KAT buses operate 6:15 a.m. until 9:15. Monday through Saturday except for routes 11,12,22,31 and 41 which run till 11:15p.m.. Route 42 operates until 10:15p.m. Sunday Service is from 8:15 a.m. until 5:15 p.m. KAT does not operate on the following holidays: New Years Day, Independence Day, Thanksgiving and Christmas.

The Saturday schedule is in effect on Martin Luther King Day, Memorial Day, Labor Day, the day before Christmas and the day after Thanksgiving.

As of January 2, 2020 the following routes offer 7-day service: 11, 12, 17, 20, 22, 23, 31, 33, 34, 41, and 42.

As of August 29,2022 because of staff shortage route 10 and 19 were temporary suspended while most routes were cut back on times.

References

External links

 

Bus transportation in Tennessee
Transportation in Knox County, Tennessee
Transportation in Knoxville, Tennessee
1967 establishments in Tennessee